Agdon Santos Menezes (born 26 January 1993), sometimes known as just Agdon,  is a Brazilian footballer who plays for Armenian club Alashkert, on loan from Ararat-Armenia as a forward.

Career
Born in Salvador, Bahia, Agdon Menezes is a youth product of Esporte Clube Vitória, playing for two seasons with their under-20 side and helping them win the Copa do Brasil Sub-20 in 2012. On 3 January 2014, he joined S.C. Braga, in the Portuguese Primeira Liga, being immediately assigned to their B-team.

Agdon Menezes made his professional debut on 9 March 2014 in home draw against F.C. Penafiel. After two years with Braga, he signed with Merelinense F.C. from the Campeonato de Portugal.

On 30 May 2018, Agdon Menezes signed a two-year contract at LigaPro club U.D. Oliveirense. With 13 goals, he was the top scorer of the 2019–20 season, which was curtailed with 11 games remaining by the COVID-19 pandemic.

Agdon Menezes switched to another team in the same division, C.D. Feirense, on 1 August 2020. After eight scoreless games, he moved the following 27 January to last-placed club Varzim S.C. on an undisclosed contract.

On 4 July 2022, Ararat-Armenia announced the signing of Agdon.

On 16 January 2023, Agdon joined Alashkert on loan for the remainder of the season alongside teammate Wbeymar.

References

External links

1993 births
Living people
Sportspeople from Salvador, Bahia
Brazilian footballers
Association football forwards
Brazilian expatriate footballers
Expatriate footballers in Portugal
Brazilian expatriate sportspeople in Portugal
Liga Portugal 2 players
Segunda Divisão players
S.C. Braga B players
Merelinense F.C. players
U.D. Oliveirense players
C.D. Feirense players
Varzim S.C. players